The J.League 1994 season was the second season of the J.League. The league fixture began on March 12, 1994, and ended on November 19, 1994.  The Suntory Championship '94 took place on November 26 and December 2, 1994.

Honours

1994 J.League clubs
The following 12 clubs participated in J.League during 1994 season. Of these clubs, Bellmare Hiratsuka, and Júblio Iwata were newly promoted from Japan Football League (former).

Kashima Antlers
Urawa Red Diamonds
JEF United Ichihara
Verdy Kawasaki
Yokohama Marinos
Yokohama Flügels
Bellmare Hiratsuka 
Shimizu S-Pulse
Júbilo Iwata 
Nagoya Grampus Eight
Gamba Osaka
Sanfrecce Hiroshima

1994 J.League format
In the 1994 season, the league followed split-season format, and each halves (or stages) were known as Suntory Series and NICOS Series for sponsorship purposes.  In each series, twelve clubs played in double round-robin format, a total of 22 games per club (per series).  The games went to golden-goal extra time and penalties if needed after regulation.  The clubs were ranked by number of wins, and tie breakers are, in the following order:
 Goal differential
 Goals scored
 Head-to-head results
 Extra match or a coin toss
The club that finished at the top of the table is declared stage champion and qualifies for the Suntory Championship.  The first stage winner, hosts the first leg in the championship series.  If the same club win both stages, the runners-up of each stages plays against each other and the winners challenges the stage winner at the championship game. 

Changes in Competition Format
 Number of competing clubs increased from 10 to 12
 Number of games per club in a series increased from 18 to 22 games and from 36 to 44 games per season.

1994 J.League final standings

Suntory Series (1st Stage) standings

NICOS Series (2nd stage) standings

Suntory Championship '94 

VERDY KAWASAKI won the series on 2-0 aggregate.

Overall standings

Golden Boots ranking

Awards

Individual Awards

Best Eleven

References
 Source: J. League 1994 (RSSSF)

J1 League seasons
1
Japan
Japan